Historia de Belgrano y de la Independencia Argentina is an Argentine history book written by Bartolomé Mitre. It is mainly a biography of Manuel Belgrano, but the author expanded the scope into the whole Argentine War of Independence, where Belgrano was involved. It was the first book about the history of Argentina, and as such it was the starting point of the historiography of Argentina. It includes as well the autobiography of Manuel Belgrano, which was published by the first time in this book.

When it was edited, the book generated controversies between the author and Dalmacio Vélez Sarsfield and Juan Bautista Alberdi.

Books by Bartolomé Mitre
Argentine biographies
History books about Argentina
History books about wars
Manuel Belgrano
1857 books